Rob de Wit may refer to:

Robert de Wit (born 1962), Dutch Olympic decathlete and bobsledder
Rob de Wit (footballer) (born 1963), Dutch footballer